Hemaiag Bedros XVII Ghedighian (in Armenian Հմայեակ Պետրոս ԺԷ. Կէտիկեան) (2 October 1905, in Partizak, Armenia – 28 November 1998, in Lebanon) was the Armenian Catholic Catholicos-Patriarch of Cilicia from July 1976 until May 1982, when he resigned because of legal age and was succeeded by Patriarch Hovhannes Bedros XVIII Kasparian. He died in 1998 at the age of 93.

Patriarch Ghedighian (French form Guédiguian) was ordained priest in 1930 and became the abbot of the Venice Mekhitarist order. He was titular holder as Archbishop of Chersonesus in Zechia from 1971 until 1978 when he was elected as patriarch of the Armenian Catholic Church. He spent all his reign of 8 years during the Lebanese Civil War.

See also
List of Armenian Catholic Patriarchs of Cilicia

References

External links
Biography on official site of the Armenian Catholic Church

1905 births
1998 deaths
Armenian Catholic Patriarchs of Cilicia
20th-century Eastern Catholic bishops
Armenian Eastern Catholics